The 1989 All-Ireland Under-21 Hurling Championship was the 26th staging of the All-Ireland Under-21 Hurling Championship since its establishment by the Gaelic Athletic Association in 1964. The championship began on 7 June 1989 and ended on 10 September 1989.

Cork entered the championship as the defending champions, however, they were beaten by Tipperary in a Munster semi-final replay.

On 10 September 1989, Tipperary won the championship following a 4-10 to 3-11 defeat of Offaly in the All-Ireland final. This was their seventh All-Ireland title overall and their first title since 1985.

Tipperary's Dan Quirke was the championship's top scorer with 7-08.

Results

Leinster Under-21 Hurling Championship

Quarter-finals

Semi-finals

Final

Munster Under-21 Hurling Championship

Quarter-finals

Semi-finals

Final

Ulster Under-21 Hurling Championship

Semi-finals

Final

All-Ireland Under-21 Hurling Championship

Semi-finals

Final

Championship statistics

Top scorers

Overall

In a single game

References

Under
All-Ireland Under-21 Hurling Championship